Yair Shimansky is a jeweler based in Cape Town, South Africa, who specializes in diamonds. He owns several retail stores in South Africa, and a diamond cutting and polishing business in Johannesburg, South Africa. Shimansky has made what is claimed to be the world's most expensive temporary tattoo and a 900 carat diamond-encrusted soccer ball created for the FIFA World Cup.

Brilliant 10 Diamond
The Brilliant 10 diamond design is a 71 facet round brilliant cut diamond design developed and patented by Shimansky. It's been stated as being the most brilliant diamond in the world. The diamond is currently the only diamond that has no light leakage, in which all of the light that enters through the table and the crown is reflected back. In contrast, a regular round brilliant diamond with 57 facets loses around 8%-12% of light even if cut to ideal proportions, in which the light loss is around the girdle area of the diamond.

See also
 Diamond (mineral)
 Diamond cut

References

Further reading

External links
 Official website
 Some diamonds developed by Shimansky from Cape Town Diamond Museum

Diamond cutting
Diamond dealers
Living people
Year of birth missing (living people)